Guzhen railway station is an elevated station of Guangzhou–Zhuhai intercity railway Jiangmen Spur Line.

The station is located at the intersection of Qijiang Lu and Dong'an Zhonglu, Guzhen Town, Zhongshan, Guangdong, China. It started operation on 7 January 2011.

References

Zhongshan
Railway stations in China opened in 2011
Railway stations in Guangdong